Kyffin Simpson (born 9 October 2004 in Bridgetown, Barbados) is a Barbadian-Caymanian racing driver competing in the 2023 Indy NXT by Firestone series for HMD Motorsports.

Personal life
Simpson is Barbados-born and a resident of the British Overseas Territory of the Cayman Islands, racing under the Caymanian flag in Indy NXT. Kyffin is the grandson of Barbadian businessman Sir Kyffin Simpson and a keen kitesurfer.

Career

Formula 4 / Regional 
Simpson made his car racing debut in 2020 for Velocity Racing Development in the US Formula 4 Championship after 9 years of karting across the Caribbean and United States. He twinned this with a Formula Regional Americas Championship campaign, and dominated the championship in his second season with podiums in all but five races.

Winning the FR Americas title awarded Kyffin with a Honda Performance Development scholarship fund worth $600,000 towards a Super Formula campaign in 2022, but Japan’s ongoing travel restrictions due to COVID-19 prevented these plans coming to fruition. His Regional F3 success also opened the door to join the Road to Indy ladder with IndyCar team Juncos Racing, competing in 16 of 18 races in 2022.

Indy Lights / GT3 
In 2022, Simpson signed a multi-year deal as a development driver with Chip Ganassi Racing, whilst also progressing to Indy Lights, partnering James Roe Jr. at TJ Speed Motorsports. Following eight races with the team, Simpson moved to HMD Motorsports. He finished ninth in the 2022 Indy Lights standings with a best result of fifth in Barber and Detroit.

Alongside his Indy Lights duties, Kyffin made his IMSA Michelin Endurance Cup debut with Gradient Racing at the wheel of an Acura NSX GT3 EVO II. Simpson, Mario Farnbacher and Till Bechtolsheimer won 2022 Motul Petit Le Mans in the GTD class.

Indy NXT / LMP2 
Simpson confirmed a return to the newly rebranded Indy NXT series in 2023 with HMD Motorsports, partnering with Chip Ganassi Racing sponsors Ridgeline Lubricants and The American Legion. He is set to compete in over 30 races across four different series with supporting LMP2 programs in IMSA, Asian Le Mans Series and European Le Mans Series.

IndyCar 
In January 2023, Kyffin completed his first NTT IndyCar Series test with Chip Ganassi Racing at Sebring International Raceway.

Racing record

Career summary

* Season still in progress.

Formula Regional Americas Championship
(key) (Races in bold indicate pole position) (Races in italics indicate fastest lap)

Complete WeatherTech SportsCar Championship results
(key) (Races in bold indicate pole position; results in italics indicate fastest lap)

American open-wheel results

Indy Lights / Indy NXT

(key) (Races in bold indicate pole position) (Races in italics indicate fastest lap) (Races with * indicate most race laps led)

Complete Asian Le Mans Series results 
(key) (Races in bold indicate pole position) (Races in italics indicate fastest lap)

Notes

References

External links
 
 

2004 births
Caymanian sportsmen
British racing drivers
Barbadian racing drivers
Indy Pro 2000 Championship drivers
Indy Lights drivers
Living people
Formula Regional Americas Championship drivers
Dale Coyne Racing drivers
Juncos Hollinger Racing drivers
WeatherTech SportsCar Championship drivers
United States F4 Championship drivers
HMD Motorsports drivers